was a town located in Higashiuwa District, Ehime Prefecture, Japan.

As of July 31, 2003, the town had a population of 10,916 and a density of 56.22 persons per km2. The total area was 187.60 km2.

On April 1, 2004, Nomura, along with the towns of Akehama, Shirokawa and Uwa (all from Higashiuwa District), and the town of Mikame (from Nishiuwa District), was merged to create the city of Seiyo.

Its main industry was stock breeding.

External links
Official website of Seiyo 

Dissolved municipalities of Ehime Prefecture
Seiyo, Ehime